Saunja may refer to places :
Saunja, India, village in South Bihar, India
Saunja, Harju County, village in Estonia
Saunja, Lääne County, village in Estonia